Juan Diego Antonio Li Naranjo (born 16 February 1995), commonly known as Juan Diego Li, is a Peruvian football player who most recently played for UTC Cajamarca.

Club career
In August 2016, Li joined Vejle Boldklub. However, after failing to make an appearance for the Danish side, he joined Alianza Lima of his native Peru in December of the same year.

Career statistics

Club

Notes

References

1995 births
Living people
Peruvian footballers
Footballers from Lima
FBC Melgar footballers
Club Deportivo Universidad de San Martín de Porres players
Vejle Boldklub players
Association football defenders
Footballers at the 2015 Pan American Games
Peruvian people of Chinese descent
Pan American Games competitors for Peru